Thiotricha pontifera is a moth of the family Gelechiidae. It was described by Edward Meyrick in 1934. It is found in Korea, Japan and Russia.

References

Moths described in 1934
Thiotricha
Taxa named by Edward Meyrick